Hörtnagl is a surname. Notable people with the surname include:

Alfred Hörtnagl (born 1966), Austrian footballer
Andreas Hörtnagl (born 1942), Austrian politician
Vinzenz Hörtnagl (born 1948), Austrian weightlifter